Sentiero 4 Luglio SkyMarathon (SkyMarathon 4th July Footpath) is a skyrunning event created in 1994 at Santicolo di Corteno Golgi by Giacomo Salvadori. Its main claim is "a real stairway to the sky".

History
Three times trial world championship (2003, 2004, 2007), for a few years (1999, 2011, 2012 and 2013) was organized in collaboration with Aprica (SO); from 2014 is again organized only by Corteno Golgi (BS). It consists of two distances: classical marathon and half marathon (this last, since 2000).

Best male marathon racers

Best female marathon racers

References

Bibliography
 Proloco Corteno Golgi - Sentiero 4 Luglio, quando l'amore si fa corsa (photobook, 2003)
 Proloco Corteno Golgi - Sortilegi di Vallecamonica, arte cultura natura sport turismo sul versante soleggiato delle Alpi Centrali (yearly magazine, since 1999)
 Giacomo Salvadori (Liberedizioni) - Lassù, tra sogno e realtà - Genesi e realizzazione del Sentiero 4 Luglio, del Bivacco Davide e della Maratona del Cielo (photobook, 2017)

External links 
 Maratona del cielo

Skyrunning competitions
Sport in Lombardy
Province of Brescia
1994 in Italian sport
Skyrunner World Series
Athletics competitions in Italy